Loon Creek Airfield  is located  south southwest of Cupar, Saskatchewan, Canada.

See also 
List of airports in Saskatchewan

References

Registered aerodromes in Saskatchewan